The Pennsylvania Heritage Foundation (PHF) is a non-profit partner of the Pennsylvania Historical and Museum Commission (PHMC), the official history agency of the Commonwealth of Pennsylvania. Established in 1983 to support the work of the PHMC in the preservation of Pennsylvania's history, the PHF is governed by a 15-member, volunteer board of directors, and operated on a day-to-day basis by two paid staff members who participate in administrative, community engagement, charitable giving and/or grants management activities.

History
Initially launched with 14 members as the Friends of the Pennsylvania Historical and Museum Commission, the Pennsylvania Heritage Foundation was officially established in 1983, and provided grants management, membership coordination, and program direction services to the Pennsylvania Historical and Museum Commission (PHMC), as well as assistance with retail operations in order to facilitate the work of PHMC archivists, historians, preservationists, and other staff in safeguarding 237 million documents and other archival items, 5 million objects, and 24 historic sites statewide, thereby ensuring access to the state's rich heritage for generations of present-day and future Pennsylvanians. The PHF also helped to improve awareness of and access to Pennsylvania heritage items for educators and students statewide through its early 21st century support of the PHMC's Teaching American History initiative.

In November 2018, the PHF was awarded a grant of $19,567 by the U.S. National Archives under its Access to Historical Records: Major Initiatives grant program to "support the work of the Pennsylvania State Historical Records Advisory Board, including the annual Archives and Records Management Seminar, the development of six to eight YouTube videos designed to increase public support for and awareness of historical records programs, creating and distributing 10,000 bookmarks advocating for the importance of preserving electronic records, and the Archives Without Tears (AWOT) workshops, which will be offered throughout the state." Prior to this, the PHF had also received National Archives funding in 2013 and 2014 for support of its Archives Without Tears workshops.

According to the PHF's website, the foundation had a roster of more than 2,000 members as of early 2019. Its staff continue to render assistance to PHMC personnel via community engagement, charitable giving and grants management, and member support assistance, and are also active in supporting the History Relevance Campaign, a nationwide initiative which has been bringing together public history professionals across America since 2012 to raise awareness about the ways in which the study and practice of history contributes to a stronger and more engaged citizenry.

In 2019, the Pennsylvania Heritage Foundation continued its collaboration with the State Museum of Pennsylvania on the state's annual art exhibition, "Art of the State." Operating for the 52nd year, the exhibition featured current work by, and awarded cash prizes to, 103 emerging and established artists from 35 Pennsylvania counties working in a variety of media, including painting, paper, photography, and sculpture.

Mission Statement
The mission statement as presented on the PHF's website reads as follows:

"The Pennsylvania Heritage Foundation is the non-profit partner of the Pennsylvania Historical and Museum Commission. Governed by a volunteer board, PHF helps preserve the Commonwealth’s rich heritage through charitable funding, membership, grant management, and community engagement."

Publications
The PHF publishes Pennsylvania Heritage® magazine four times per year in partnership with the Pennsylvania Historical and Museum Commission (PHMC). According to the organization's website, "The magazine is intended to introduce readers to the Keystone State’s rich culture and historic legacy, to educate them on the value of preserving that legacy, and to entertain and involve them in such a way as to ensure that Pennsylvania’s past has a future." In its 2021 Annual Report, PHMC noted that Pennsylvania Heritage was in its 47th year of publication.

PHF personnel have also penned articles for outside scholarly publications, including Pennsylvania History: A Journal of Mid-Atlantic Studies.

References

External links
 Pennsylvania Heritage Foundation (official website)
 Pennsylvania Heritage® magazine (official website)
 History Relevance Campaign (official website)

Government agencies established in 1983
State history organizations of the United States
Education in Pennsylvania
1983 establishments in Pennsylvania